Paul Cheng Ming-fun, JP (born 19 October 1936, Xiamen) is a Hong Kong entrepreneur and politician. He was first appointed to Legislative Council in 1988 and was the LegCo member for the Commercial (First) constituency (1995–97) and also the Provisional Legislative Council (1996–98). He was the chairman of the Hong Kong General Chamber of Commerce from 1992 to 1994 and honorary steward of the Hong Kong Jockey Club.

References

1936 births
Living people
Members of the Provisional Legislative Council
Hong Kong businesspeople
Hong Kong Christians
University of Pennsylvania alumni
Lake Forest College alumni
Business and Professionals Federation of Hong Kong politicians
HK LegCo Members 1988–1991
HK LegCo Members 1995–1997
Members of the Selection Committee of Hong Kong
Members of the Preparatory Committee for the Hong Kong Special Administrative Region
Hong Kong film producers